Pietro Rimoldi (Sacconago, Busto Arsizio, Lombardy, Italy, 5 November 1911 – Busto Arsizio, 14 November 2000) was an Italian cyclist who competed as a professional from 1932 to 1942.

His best results are victories in the Coppa Bernocchi in 1934 and the Giro del Piemonte in 1938. He also achieved podium finishes in the Italian Classics Milan - San Remo in 1933 and 1940 and the Giro di Lombardia in 1933.

Palmares 
DNF - Did not finish

 1933
 3rd Milan - San Remo
 3rd Giro di Lombardia
 1934
 1st Coppa Bernocchi
 1st Circuito Emiliano, Bologna
 1935
 1st Coppa Collecchio
 1936
 1st Genoa–Nice
 1st Coppa Città Busto Arsizio
 1937
 1st Coppa Città Busto Arsizio
 1938
 1st Giro del Piemonte
 1940
 2nd Milano - Sanremo

Results for the Giro de Italia 
 1933: 35th
 1934: DNF
 1936: 38th
 1937: 30th
 1938: 34th
 1939: 47th
 1940: 43rd

Result for the Tour de France 
 1935: DNF (stage 15)

References

External links
 Page at CyclingRanking.com
 Page at museociclismo.it
 Page at sitiodeciclismo.net

1911 births
2000 deaths
Italian male cyclists
Cyclists from the Province of Varese
People from Busto Arsizio